Mopperipalayam is a panchayat town in Coimbatore district in the Indian state of Tamil Nadu.

Demographics
 India census, Mopperipalayam had a population of 8303. Males constitute 52% of the population and females 48%. Mopperipalayam has an average literacy rate of 60%, higher than the national average of 59.5%: male literacy is 68%, and female literacy is 50%. In Mopperipalayam, 11% of the population is under 6 years of age.

References

Cities and towns in Coimbatore district
Suburbs of Coimbatore